Marg Sar may refer to:

Marg Sar, Lorestan